Myron Coureval Fagan (October 31, 1887 – May 12, 1972) was an American writer, producer and director for film and theatre and a red scare figure in the late 1940s and 1950s. Fagan was an ardent anti-communist and influential conspiracy theorist.

Career
Fagan arrived on Broadway in 1907, where he quickly became one of the younger playwrights in American theater. Over the years, he worked in the theater with Alla Nazimova, Douglas Fairbanks, and John Barrymore. He also directed plays for the producers such as Charles Frohman, David Belasco. Fagan also became the dramatic editor of the Associated Newspapers. Many of the actors, including Humphrey Bogart, Brian Donlevy and Robert Ryan, whom Fagan directed or who appeared in his plays or screen adaptions, later became stars in Hollywood.

In 1916, Fagan took a break from the theater to serve as director of public relations for Republican presidential candidate Charles Evans Hughes. When a similar offer was made in 1928 to him by Herbert Hoover, he turned it down.

In 1929, the sound movie of his play The Great Power earned the dubious record of being the shortest run of any movie at the Capitol Theatre, New York. It was replaced with a silent comedy film after only one performance.

He moved to Hollywood in 1930, where he served as a writer and director with Pathe Pictures, Inc., then owned by Joseph P. Kennedy, at 20th Century Fox, and other Hollywood film studios.

Anti-communism
In 1945, Fagan claimed he saw secret documents of the meetings in Yalta, shown to him by author John T. Flynn, that led him to write the plays Red Rainbow  and Thieves Paradise.  Written in 1945, Red Rainbow portrays Franklin Roosevelt, Joseph Stalin and others in Yalta plotting to deliver the Balkans, Eastern Europe and Berlin to Stalin. Left-wing groups in the New York opposed the production of the play, and Fagan had difficulties getting financial backing to produce it. Fagan took the play to Hollywood where he encountered more protests against it than he had in New York.

In the late 1940s, Fagan launched a one-man crusade against what he claimed was a "Red Conspiracy in Hollywood". Out of this crusade came the Cinema Educational Guild.

In 1953, Red Rainbow was produced by Bruce Fagan and staged for 16 performances at the Royal Theatre  between September 14 and 26.

Written two years later, Thieves Paradise portrays the same group plotting to create the United Nations as a Communist front for one world government.

Despite opposition, Thieves Paradise opened at the Las Palmas Theatre in Hollywood on December 26, 1947. It starred Howard Johnson, who was subject to a campaign of harassment so bitter and intense that it sent him to St. Vincent's Hospital with a nervous breakdown after six performances, and he never made another movie in Hollywood.Thieves Paradise was produced and staged at the El Patio theatre in Hollywood in April 1948. It opened on April 12, and despite protest against it, was able to complete its run.

Pamphleteer
From this period onward, Fagan did not produce any more work for stage or screen; instead he wrote anti-communist pamphlets, such as "Hollywood Reds Are on the Run", and bulletins for the remainder of his life.

The Eleventh Report of the Senate Fact-Finding Subcommittee on Un-American Activities of the California Legislature stated this of Fagan's anti-Communist lists, 
But those who realized their mistake and left the front organizations in disgust and disillusionment are often still carried as subversives on the Fagan lists, and therein lies the danger from any unofficial organization that undertakes to publish lists of alleged subversive organizations and individuals. They do not have the facilities, nor the authority, nor the experience to handle these matters in an expert fashion and therefore they produce an enormous amount of harm by falsely accusing individuals who are not only loyal but who have profited greatly by their unfortunate experiences in having been lured into Communist-front groups.

Recordings
Between 1967 and 1968, Fagan recorded a set of three spoken-word LP records titled The Illuminati and the Council on Foreign Relations. Produced by Anthony Hilder, the records presented the Bavarian Illuminati, the Protocols of Zion, and internationalist politics as faces of a single grand "Luciferian" conspiracy directed by the Rothschild family. In 1968, he recorded another three LP spoken voice recordings, also produced by Anthony Hilder, titled Red Stars Over Hollywood.

Death
Myron C. Fagan died on May 12, 1972 in Los Angeles, California.

Credits

Plays

Source: Internet Broadway Database

Motion pictures

Source: Internet Movie Database

Books and articles

References

External links

Myron Fagan's FBI files, obtained under the FOIA and hosted at the Internet Archive:

part 1
part 2
part 3
part 4
part 5
part 6
part 7
part 8
part 9
part 10
part 11
part 12
part 13
part 14
part 15
part 16
part 17
part 18
part 19
part 20

1887 births
1972 deaths
American film directors
American conspiracy theorists
Place of birth missing
20th-century American dramatists and playwrights
New York (state) Republicans
Far-right politics in the United States
American anti-communists
Old Right (United States)